Qutluq Bilge Qaghan (died 795 CE) was the sixth khagan of the Uyghur Khaganate and the last one from the Yaglakar clan. His Tang invested title was Fengcheng Qaghan.

Life 
He was born in 776 according to Zizhi Tongjian, while Cefu Yuangui, New Book of Tang and Old Book of Tang suggests he was born in 774–775. According to Colin Mackerras, these numbers merely meant that he was a minor. He was put under regency of Grand Chancellor Inanchu Bilge (頡千逝斯) of Xiedie (𨁂跌) clan.

Reign 
During his reign, the Uyghurs formed an alliance with Tang China against the Tibetans and Karluks who were struggling for supremacy in the Tarim Basin. He died soon enough without an heir. He was followed by Grand Chancellor Inanchu Bilge in a kurultai. Even though the royal clan changed from the Yaglakar to the Ädiz clan, his successor adopted a Yaglakar surname because of the prestige.

References 

770s births
795 deaths
8th-century Turkic people
8th-century monarchs in Asia
Yaglakar clan
Tengrist monarchs
Child monarchs from Asia